Ľuboš Belejík (born 23 September 1985 in Stará Ľubovňa) is a Slovak football player, who currently plays for 1. FC Tatran Prešov.

External links
 1. FC Tatran Prešov profile

References

1985 births
Slovak footballers
Living people
1. FC Tatran Prešov players
Slovak Super Liga players
People from Stará Ľubovňa
Sportspeople from the Prešov Region
Association football forwards